Illingworth is a locality in Alberta, Canada.

The locality has the name of W. J. Illingworth, a railroad official.

References 

Localities in Cypress County